MotoGP 10/11 is a racing game based on the 2010 MotoGP season and the 2011 MotoGP season. The game was released by Capcom on March 15, 2011, for the PlayStation 3 and Xbox 360.

References

2011 video games
Capcom games
Grand Prix motorcycle racing video games
PlayStation 3 games
Racing video games
Video games developed in the United Kingdom
Xbox 360 games
Video games set in Australia
Video games set in California
Video games set in the Czech Republic
Video games set in England
Video games set in France
Video games set in Germany
Video games set in Indianapolis
Video games set in Italy
Video games set in Japan
Video games set in Malaysia
Video games set in the Netherlands
Video games set in Qatar
Video games set in Spain
Video games set in Portugal